Doug Gabbard, II is a judge on the Oklahoma Court of Civil Appeals, the intermediate appellate court in the state of Oklahoma.

Background and education

Judge Doug Gabbard was born in Lindsay, Oklahoma and earned a bachelor's and Juris Doctor degree from the University of Oklahoma.

References

Year of birth missing (living people)
Living people
Oklahoma state court judges